Zabka may refer to:
 Żabka, Opole Voivodeship, a village in south-western Poland
 Żabka (convenience store), a Polish chain of convenience stores

People
 Boris Žabka (born 1977), Slovak ice hockey coach
 Marek Michał Żabka (born 1955), Polish arachnologist (zoological abbreviation: Zabka)
 William Zabka (born 1965), American actor

See also
 

Slavic-language surnames